Rhizotrogus romanoi is a species of beetle in the Melolonthinae subfamily that is endemic to Sicily.

References

Beetles described in 1975
romanoi
Endemic fauna of Sicily
Beetles of Europe